Dr. Michael Duffy is a naval historian, specialising in the Napoleonic war period. He is reader in British history and director of the Centre for Maritime Historical Studies at the University of Exeter.

Academic career
Duffy earned his BA in history, MA, and DPhil in history at the University of Oxford. Appointed to the faculty of the University of Exeter, he has been assistant lecturer, lecturer, senior lecturer, head of history and dean of arts. Appointed director of the Centre for Maritime Historical Studies in 1991, he was promoted to reader in British history in 2001.

He has been vice-president of the Navy Records Society and editor of the Mariner's Mirror.

Published books
 The military revolution and the state, 1500-1800, edited by Michael Duffy (1980)
 Soldiers, sugar and seapower: the British expeditions to the West Indies and the war against revolutionary France (1987)
 Parameters of British naval power 1650-1850(1992)
 The new maritime history of Devon, edited by Michael Duffy, et al. (1992, 1994)
 Profiles in Power: The Younger Pitt (2000)
 The Glorious First of June: A naval battle and its aftermath, edited by Roger Morriss and Michael Duffy (2003)
 The Naval Miscellany, Vol. 6, Navy Records Society, 2003.
 Touch and take : The Battle of Trafalgar 21 October 1805 (2005)

Contributions to books
 'Naples between the Great Powers in the Revolutionary Era', in J. Roberston and J. Davis, eds., Studies on Voltaire and the Eighteenth Century.
 The Oxford Dictionary of National Biography (2004) entries for Sir Samuel Hood, Sir William Hoste, Sir Robert Waller Otway, Sir Samuel Pum, Sir Thomas Staines, Sir Richard Strachan, James Walker, Sir Nesbit Willoughby, Sir James Lucas Yeo, Gilbert Elliot-Murray-Kynynmound, 1st Earl of Minto.
'La artileeria en Trafalgar: adiestramiento, tactica y moral de combate', in A. Guimera and A Butron (eds), Trafalgar y el mundo altantico, Madrid: Marcel Pons Historia, 2004.
 'Sir Samuel Hood', in R. Harding and P. LeFevre (eds), Contemporaries of Nelson: British admirals 1793-1815, Chatham Press, 2004.
 'Preface', in M. Duffy (ed), The Naval Miscellany Vol 6, Ashgate/ Navy/ Records Society, 2003, pp.xi-xiii.
 'Edmund Dummer', in M.Duffy (ed), The Naval Miscellany, Vol 6, Navy Records Society, 2003, pp. 93–147.
 "Science and Labour". The Naval Contribution to Operations Ashore in the Great Wars with France 1793-1815', in P. Hore (ed), Seapower Ashore: 200 years of Extraordinary Nanal Operations, Chatham, 2001, pp. 39–52.
 'The man who missed the grain convoy: Rear Admiral George Montagu and the arrival of Vanstabel's convoy from America in 1794', in M. Duffy and R. Morriss, eds., The Glorious First of June: A naval battle and its aftermath, Exeter Maritime Studies, 2001, pp. 101–19.
 'Contested Empires 1756-1815', in Paul Langford, ed., Short History of the British Isles 1688-1815, Oxford University Press, pp. 213–42.

References

English naval historians
Academics of the University of Exeter
Fellows of the Royal Historical Society
Living people
British maritime historians
Year of birth missing (living people)